The Wall of Tarragona (Catalan and Spanish: Muralla de Tarragona) is a wall located in Tarragona, Catalonia, Spain. It was declared Bien de Interés Cultural in 1884.

References

See also 
 List of Bien de Interés Cultural in the Province of Tarragona

Bien de Interés Cultural landmarks in the Province of Tarragona
Tarragona